Miracle is a 2004 American sports film about the United States men's ice hockey team, led by head coach Herb Brooks, portrayed by Kurt Russell, who won the gold medal in the 1980 Winter Olympics. The American team's victory over the heavily favored Soviet professionals in the medal round was dubbed the "Miracle on Ice". Miracle was directed by Gavin O'Connor and written by Eric Guggenheim and Mike Rich. It was released on February 20, 2004, where it grossed $64.5 million on a $28 million budget and received positive reviews, with Russell's performance garnering the most praise from critics.

Plot 
Herb Brooks, head ice hockey coach at the University of Minnesota, interviews with the United States Olympic Committee (USOC) for the national team coach's job, discussing his philosophy on how to beat the dominant Soviet team who have won the gold medal in the previous four Olympics, calling for changes to the practice schedule and strategy. The USOC is skeptical, but gives Brooks the job.

Brooks meets assistant coach Craig Patrick at the tryouts in Colorado Springs. Brooks selects a preliminary roster of 26, indifferent to the preferences of senior USOC hockey officials. USOC executive director Walter Bush believes Brooks has their best interests at heart, and reluctantly agrees to take the heat from the committee.

During the initial practice, tempers flare as forward Rob McClanahan and defenseman Jack O'Callahan get into a fight based on college rivalry. After the fight, Brooks tells all the players that they are to let go of old rivalries and start becoming a team. He has each player tell their name, hometown and which team they play for. As practices continue, Brooks uses unorthodox methods to reduce the roster to 20 players. The players themselves worry about being cut at any time, knowing that Brooks himself was the last player cut from the US squad that won the 1960 Olympic gold medal, so he will do anything to win.

During an exhibition game against Norway in Oslo that ends in a 3–3 tie, Brooks notices the players are not playing up to their potential. After the game, he orders them back on the ice for a bag skatea relentless double-skate from one end of the ice to the other, continuing the drill even after the rink manager cuts the power. Exhausted, forward and team captain Mike Eruzione re-introduces himself, but this time says that he plays for the United States. Pleased, Brooks finally allows the team to go home.

With their roster finalized, the Americans play the Soviets in an exhibition game at Madison Square Garden. The Soviets manhandle the young Americans, winning by a score of 10–3. During the game, O'Callahan suffers a knee injury that could keep him out of the entire Olympics and starting goaltender Jim Craig is told he may be benched in favor of backup Steve Janaszak. Brooks tells him that he hasn't been giving his very best, but decides to keep Craig as the starter for the Olympics.

As the 1980 Winter Olympics begin, the Americans trail Sweden 2–1 in the first game. Brooks fires up the team during intermission by throwing a table and accuses McClanahan, who suffered a relatively minor leg injury, of quitting. McClanahan plays injured, which inspires the team. Bill Baker scores a goal with only 27 seconds remaining in the third period for a dramatic 2–2 tie. They next earn a 7–3 win over heavily favored Czechoslovakia. As the Olympics continue, the team defeats minor opponents Norway, Romania, and West Germany to earn a spot in the medal round.

In the medal round, the Americans were overwhelming underdogs to the Soviets, who lost only a single Olympic game since 1964 and whose players were professionals, whereas the American players were amateurs. The Soviets had scored the first goal before O'Callahan, having healed enough from his injury, enters the game for the first time. He heavily checks Vladimir Krutov on a play that leads to a goal by Buzz Schneider. The Soviets score again to retake the lead. Soviet goalie Vladislav Tretiak stops a long shot by Dave Christian, but Mark Johnson gets the rebound and ties the game to end the period.

During the first intermission, Soviet coach Viktor Tikhonov replaces Tretiak with backup Vladimir Myshkin. In the second period, the Soviets score a goal to go up 3–2. Early in the third period, the Soviet team is penalized for slashing, and Johnson scores a power play goal just as the penalty is about to expire. With 10 minutes left, Eruzione puts them ahead 4–3. The Americans hold off the Soviets to win the game, completing one of the biggest upsets in sports history. Two days later, the team would go on to defeat Finland 4–2 to win the gold medal.

A closing narration from Brooks states that his proudest moment was watching the team being presented with their gold medals. Admiring the sacrifices all of them were willing to make, and the inspiration they provided to the people of the United States.

Cast

Production 
Gavin O'Connor directed, and Mark Ciardi produced the movie. Both are drawn to inspirational stories, and they decided to take on the "Greatest Sports Moment of the 20th Century". They chose to focus on the determination and focus of coach Herb Brooks. O'Connor knew from the beginning that he wanted to cast Kurt Russell as Herb Brooks because he needed someone with an athletic background and a fiery passion for sports. The casting of the team consisted of real hockey players to give the film a raw and accurate feel. O'Connor figured it would be easier to teach hockey players to act than to teach actors to play hockey. On-ice tryouts were held in New York, Boston, Minneapolis, Los Angeles, Toronto, and Vancouver. Another tryout was held in Vancouver for the Soviet and European teams.

There are a total of 133 different hockey plays in the film. To accomplish this, the directors turned to ReelSports Solutions, who had helped with the producers on a previous movie, The Rookie. The ReelSports team referred to coach Herb Brooks for information on practices, plays, equipment, and uniform styles. Each fight and stunt scene was choreographed to ensure the actors' safety. Players went through a six-week training camp to relearn the game in older equipment.

All the locations of the real life hockey games are replicated by hockey arenas in British Columbia. The team tryouts, set in Colorado Springs, were filmed at the Queen's Park Arena in New Westminster. The team practices were filmed at the M.S.A. Arena in Abbotsford. The exhibition game in which the USA team lost to the USSR team at Madison Square Garden was filmed at the Pacific Coliseum, former home of the Vancouver Canucks. The Exhibition against Norway, the subsequent bag skate, and all Olympic game scenes were filmed at the PNE Agrodome.

Al Michaels re-recorded most of his television commentary for the film. However, the last 30 seconds of the USA-Soviet game, including "Do you believe in miracles?" used the original audio, as Michaels didn't feel he could re-create the call effectively.

Coach Brooks died in a car accident half a year before the movie was released. At the end, before the credits, it states, "This film is dedicated to the memory of Herb Brooks, who died shortly following principal photography. He never saw it. He lived it."

Music 
"Mr. Boogie"
"You Can Suit Yourself" by Bobby Charles
"Time and Time Again"
"Don't Fear the Reaper" by Blue Öyster Cult
"Must of Got Lost" by The J. Geils Band
"Thunder Island" by Jay Ferguson
"Rockford Files Theme" by Mike Post
"Universal Logo"
"Nightly News Theme '82"
"White Christmas" by Louis Armstrong
"Rockin' Around the Christmas Tree" by Brenda Lee
"Star-Spangled Banner" by Lauren Hart
"Bugler's Dream" by John Williams and the Boston Pops Orchestra
"Dream On" by Aerosmith
"Brandenburg Concerto No. 4 in G, 1st movement – Allegro" by the Royal Philharmonic Orchestra

Release 
Miracle was released with a rating of PG, meaning that Parental Guidance is suggested.

Reception

Box office 
Miracle grossed $19,377,577 on its opening weekend, February 8, on 2,605 screens. It closed with a worldwide gross of $64,445,708.

Critical response 
On Rotten Tomatoes, Miracle has an approval rating of 81% based on 165 reviews, with an average rating of 7.01/10. The site's critical consensus reads: "Kurt Russell's performance guides this cliche-ridden tale into the realm of inspirational, nostalgic goodness." On Metacritic the film has a weighted average score of 68 out of 100, based on 36 critics, indicating "generally favorable reviews". Audiences polled by CinemaScore gave the film an average grade of "A" on an A+ to F scale.

Elvis Mitchell of The New York Times stated that the movie "does a yeoman's job of recycling the day-old dough that passes for its story." Kenneth Turan of the Los Angeles Times referred to the movie as "a classically well-made studio entertainment that, like The Rookie of a few years back, has the knack of being moving without shamelessly overdoing a sure thing." O'Callahan said in an interview that while the fight between him and McClanahan was fictional, the film accurately portrayed the "pretty intense" rivalry between Boston Terriers and Minnesota Gophers players, and was overall "pretty darn close" to actual events.

As of January 2017 Miracle was rated the number two sports movie of all time with a rating of 8.85 out of 10 in the ongoing poll at Sports In Movies, after maintaining the number one spot for several years.

Accolades 
Miracle won the Best Sports Movie ESPY Award for 2004.

Year-end lists
In 2006, the American Film Institute nominated this film for AFI's 100 Years...100 Cheers. And In 2008, AFI nominated this film for its Top 10 Sports Films list.

See also 
List of sports films
Miracle on Ice (1981 film)

References

External links 

 
 
 
 

2000s sports drama films
2004 drama films
2004 films
American ice hockey films
American sports drama films
Biographical films about sportspeople
Cold War films
Cultural depictions of hockey players
2000s English-language films
Films about the 1980 Winter Olympics
Films directed by Gavin O'Connor
Films scored by Mark Isham
Films set in 1979
Films set in 1980
Films set in Minnesota
Films set in New York (state)
Films shot in Vancouver
Ice hockey at the 1980 Winter Olympics
Sports films based on actual events
Walt Disney Pictures films
Films set in Colorado
2000s American films